Martindale Heights is a community in the city of St. Catharines, Ontario, Canada. It is located in the west end, concentrated in and around Martindale Road. The Martindale area is bounded to the south by Niagara Regional Road 77, to the east by the Twelve Mile Creek, to the west by the Highway 406 and to the north by Niagara Regional Road 87.

The area has convenient access to the two major highways that run through the Niagara Region, the Queen Elizabeth Way and the 406.

The area has seen a significant increase in residential development and more recently, the creation of a power centre featuring "big box" format stores.  Like Vansickle, the area is quickly running out of space to grow, as new government restrictions prohibit development on tender fruit lands in the Niagara Peninsula. This area used to be primarily grapevines and local residents refer to it as the G.A.(Grapeview Area).

The area is home to two elementary schools, Grapeview Public School and St. Teresa of Calcutta Catholic School. Several churches are present too. These churches include Grapeview Church and Jubilee Fellowship Christian Reformed Church.

The Martindale area is home to the Niagara Regional Health Care System and the site of a new hospital.

References

http://www.niagarahealth.on.ca/en/sites-and-services/details/st-catharines

Neighbourhoods in St. Catharines